Henryk Glücklich (22 January 1945 – 23 September 2014) was an international motorcycle speedway rider who appeared in the Speedway World Championship finals three times, finishing fifth in 1970. He also rode in five World Team Cup finals.

World Final appearances

Individual World Championship
 1969 -  London, Wembley Stadium -  12th - 5pts
 1970 -  Wroclaw, Olympic Stadium -  5th - 9pts
 1975 -  London, Wembley Stadium - 16th - 0pts

World Team Cup
 1968 -  London, Wembley Stadium (with Andrzej Wyglenda / Edmund Migoś / Paweł Waloszek / Edward Jancarz) - 3rd - 19pts (2)
 1969 -  Rybnik, Rybnik Municipal Stadium (with Edward Jancarz / Andrzej Wyglenda / Stanislaw Tkocz / Andrzej Pogorzelski) - Winner - 31pts (3)
 1970 -  London, Wembley Stadium (with Antoni Woryna / Jan Mucha / Paweł Waloszek / Edmund Migoś) - 3rd - 20pts (3)
 1971 -  Wroclaw, Olympic Stadium (with Paweł Waloszek / Antoni Woryna / Edward Jancarz / Andrzej Wyglenda) - 3rd - 19pts (4)
 1972 -  Olching, Olching Speedwaybahn (with Zenon Plech / Paweł Waloszek / Marek Cieślak / Zdzisław Dobrucki) - 3rd - 21pts (6)
 1975 -  Norden, Motodrom Halbemond (with Zenon Plech / Edward Jancarz / Marek Cieslak / Jerzy Rembas) - 4th - 9pt (2)

References 

1945 births
2014 deaths
Polish speedway riders
Polish people of German descent
People from Rybnik
Polonia Bydgoszcz riders
Reading Racers riders
Burials in Municipal Cemeteries in Bydgoszcz